The General Motors T-car was a platform designation for a worldwide series of rear-wheel drive, unibody subcompact cars. It was GM's first attempt to develop a small car to be sold internationally with engineering assistance from Isuzu Motors of Japan, and GM's Opel Division of Germany. GM's European Divisions Vauxhall, Opel, and Australian Division Holden were already producing small vehicles for their respective local markets, but subcompact car production wasn't being done by GM in North America until the introduction of the Vega earlier. Subcompacts from international divisions were being offered in North America as captive imports.

The platform was superseded by GM T platform (FWD).

List of GM T-cars (rear-wheel drive)
Body styles; (1) Coupe; (2) 2-door sedan (B11); (3) 3-door hatchback (B08); (4) 4-door sedan (B69); (5) 5-door hatchback (B68) (wheelbase 2in. longer than the others); (w) 3-door wagon(B15); (t) Pickup truck (v) Sedan delivery (B70) (Panel Van).

 Argentina
 GMC Chevette 4
 Opel K-180 4
 Australia
 Holden Gemini 1, 4, w
 Holden Piazza Coupé
 Brazil
 Chevrolet Chevette 2,3,4
 Chevrolet Marajó w
 Chevrolet Chevy 500 t
 Canada
 Chevrolet Chevette 3,5
 Pontiac Acadian 3, 5
 Colombia
 Chevrolet Chevette
 Ecuador
 Aymesa Cóndor 2,3,t
 Chevrolet San Remo 4
 Germany
 Opel Kadett C 1,2,3,4,w, targa 
 Indonesia
 Holden Gemini 4
 Japan
 Isuzu Bellett Gemini 1,4
 Isuzu Gemini 1, 4
 Isuzu Piazza Coupe, totally different body styling.
 Malaysia
 Opel Gemini
 New Zealand
 Vauxhall Chevette 2,3,4,w
 Vauxhall Chevanne v
 Isuzu Gemini 1, 4
 Holden Gemini 4, w
 South Korea 
 Saehan Bird 4
 Saehan Max t
 Daewoo Maepsy 4
 Daewoo Max t
 UK
 Vauxhall Chevette 2,3,4,w
 Bedford Chevanne  v
 United States 
 Chevrolet Chevette 3,5
 Opel Kadett 1,4; 
 Pontiac T1000 3,5
 Opel-Isuzu 1,4
 Isuzu Impulse See "Piazza/Impulse" above
 Isuzu I-Mark 1,4
 Uruguay
 Grumett 250m Grumett Chevette Grumett Sport
 Venezuela
 Chevrolet Chevette
 Chevrolet San Remo w

References

External links
 General Motors T-car history
 General Motors T-car site

T (RWD)